Nailiya Yulamanova (born 6 September 1980) is a Russian long-distance runner who specializes in the marathon.

She won the Saransk Marathon in 2006 and went on to finish twelfth at the 2006 European Championships and 32nd at the 2007 World Championships.

Yulamanova won the Prague International Marathon in 2007 and 2008, the Istanbul Marathon in 2008 and the Rotterdam Marathon in 2009. She competed in the women's marathon at the 2009 World Championships in Athletics and finished eighth overall, the second best European finisher after Marisa Barros of Portugal.

She placed ninth at the 2010 Boston Marathon, but went on to finish in second position behind Lithuania's Živilė Balčiūnaitė in the women's marathon at the 2010 European Athletics Championships, which led Russia to the title of the European Marathon Cup. Yulamanova was subsequently awarded the gold medal after Balčiūnaitė was disqualified for a doping offence.

She won the Shanghai Marathon in December in a new personal best of 2:26:05. Initially set for the 2011 Berlin Marathon, she instead chose the Amsterdam Marathon and came fifth with a time of 2:26:39 hours.

She was given a two-year ban from competition, lasting from 10 February 2012 to 2014. Abnormalities in her biological passport showed proof that she had committed doping offences. Her results were annulled from 20 August 2009 until the date of the ban. This period included her European marathon title win and her personal best-setting run in Shanghai.

International competitions

Professional marathons

See also
List of doping cases in athletics
Russia at the World Athletics Championships
Doping at the World Athletics Championships
Marathons at the World Championships in Athletics
List of stripped European Athletics Championships medals

References

External links
marathoninfo

1980 births
Living people
Sportspeople from Tolyatti
Russian female long-distance runners
Russian female marathon runners
World Athletics Championships athletes for Russia
Athletes stripped of World Athletics Championships medals
Russian Athletics Championships winners
Doping cases in athletics
Russian sportspeople in doping cases
20th-century Russian women
21st-century Russian women